Gölyurt can refer to:

 Gölyurt, Gerger
 Gölyurt, İspir